Clive Williams (born 2 November 1948) is a former  international rugby union player. He toured twice with the British & Irish Lions, to New Zealand in 1977 and to South Africa in 1980.

Williams came to prominence playing for Aberavon RFC where he became a formidable scrummager under the coaching of the ex-Welsh International prop – Phil Morgan.

He was selected for the 1977 Lions tour but remarkably on his return to his club, he lost his place to the then un-capped John Richardson.

Williams left the club and joined Swansea RFC and was again selected to play for the 1980 Lions.

Notes

1948 births
Living people
Aberavon RFC players
Barbarian F.C. players
British & Irish Lions rugby union players from Wales
Neath RFC players
Rugby union players from Porthcawl
Rugby union props
Swansea RFC players
Wales international rugby union players
Welsh rugby union players